E. W. Moore was an American painter, photographer, and gallery owner.

Moore  was the brother of Otis M. Moore, proprietor of the Hoquiam Record and Daily Washingtonian. He came to Hoquiam, Washington in early 1918. He worked at Frank G. Abell's photography firm before eventually taking it over when Abell moved on. The Portland Art Museum has his photograph of Susan Whalley Allison in their collection. He was also a captain.

In 1897, Moore was contracted to paint a portrait of Oregon governor William Paine Lord to hang in the Oregon State Capitol in Salem. He was also contracted to paint portraits of governors Frank W. Benson and Jay Bowerman, as well as former governor Ben W. Olcott. In addition to these portraits, he also painted a portrait of Samuel Benn, a pioneer of Aberdeen, Washington, and made a posthumous painting of Seattle newspaper editor Col. Alden J. Blethen.

Also a photographer, Moore took a photograph of John C. Robertson. He worked for Frank G. Abell before eventually taking over his photographic studio.

References

Year of birth missing
Year of death missing
Place of birth missing
Place of death missing
Painters from Washington (state)
Photographers from Washington (state)
People from Hoquiam, Washington
American portrait painters